Association Sportive d'Ali Sabieh/Djibouti Télécom, or simply AS Ali Sabieh or ASAS Djibouti Télécom, is a Djiboutian football club located in Ali Sabieh, Djibouti. It currently plays in the Djibouti Premier League.

Stadium
Currently the team plays at the 20,000-capacity Stade du Ville.

Current squad

Titles
Djibouti Premier League: 7
2008–09, 2012–13, 2013–14, 2014–15, 2015–16, 2016–17, 2017–18
Djibouti Cup: 3
2005–06 (as AS Ali Sabieh), 2015–16, 2017–18

References

External links
Soccerway

Football clubs in Djibouti